Gale William McGee (March 17, 1915April 9, 1992) was a United States Senator of the Democratic Party, and United States Ambassador to the Organization of American States (OAS). He represented Wyoming in the United States Senate from 1959 until 1977. To date, he remains the last Democrat to have represented Wyoming in the U.S. Senate.

Early life
McGee was born in Lincoln, Nebraska, on March 17, 1915. He attended public schools, and had planned to study law in college, but was forced by the Great Depression to attend the State Teachers College in Wayne, Nebraska, instead. He graduated from the Teachers College in 1936, and worked as a high school teacher while studying for a master's degree in history at the University of Colorado. He continued as a college instructor at Nebraska Wesleyan University, Iowa State College, and Notre Dame. In 1946, McGee received his Ph.D. in history from the University of Chicago.

University of Wyoming
Shortly after he received his Ph.D., McGee accepted a position as a professor of American history at the University of Wyoming. Soon after, he founded and served as chair of the University's Institute of International Affairs, which brought national dignitaries every summer through a Carnegie Foundation grant. Twenty-one teachers from Wyoming high schools were selected each summer to participate.  For the next 12 years, the Institute brought international foreign policy thinkers such as Eleanor Roosevelt, Hans Morgenthau, and Henry Kissinger.

In 1952, McGee took a one-year leave of absence from the University of Wyoming to serve as a Carnegie Research Fellow in New York with the Council on Foreign Relations, where he was assigned to research the mysteries of Soviet intentions.

In 1956, because of the connections he made during his Carnegie fellowship, McGee led a group of teachers on a trip to the Soviet Union; it was the first trip of its kind.

Political career

1958 election 
Active in Democratic Party politics, McGee was asked to run for the United States Congress in 1950, but declined, saying he wanted to get more in touch with Wyoming and its people. In 1955–56 he took a leave of absence from the university to work as top aide to Wyoming Democratic Senator Joseph C. O'Mahoney.

In 1958 McGee left the university to make his bid for the U.S. Senate, challenging incumbent Frank A. Barrett. He ran on a program of youth and new ideas. The race between McGee and Barrett attracted the attention of national party leaders on both sides. Senate Majority Leader Lyndon Johnson, Senator John F. Kennedy, Senator Wayne Morse of Oregon, Senator-elect Edmund Muskie of Maine, Congressman Joseph M. Montoya of New Mexico, and former President Harry S. Truman came to the state to support McGee, whose campaign slogan was "McGee for Me!". Lyndon Johnson pledged that, if Wyoming sent McGee to Washington, he would appoint him to the prestigious Appropriations Committee. Eleanor Roosevelt even conducted a national fund-raising drive for him.  Barrett received assistance from national leaders as well, including Vice President Richard Nixon. McGee ultimately defeated Barrett by a margin of 1,913 votes out of a total of 116,230 votes cast in the election.

He won the majority of the votes in seven of the 23 counties. These were the southern "Union Pacific" counties (Albany, Carbon, Laramie, Sweetwater, Uinta) Platte, just north of Cheyenne, and Sheridan in the north. McGee won the endorsement of the Wyoming AFL-CIO Committee on Political Education (COPE) and the labor vote played an important part in the election.

He became a member of the Democratic class of 1958, which was elected in the middle of President Eisenhower's second term.

First Senate term 
After his victory McGee was appointed to the Interstate and Foreign Commerce Committee and Senate Majority Leader Johnson kept his promise and appointed him to the prestigious Appropriations Committee. McGee and his fellow Senate freshmen, Thomas J. Dodd and Robert C. Byrd, were the first freshmen ever to receive such an appointment.

The confirmation of Lewis Strauss (1959) 
In 1958, President Dwight D. Eisenhower nominated Lewis Strauss to serve as Secretary of Commerce. Previously, Strauss had served in numerous government positions in the administrations of presidents Truman and Eisenhower. At the time, the 13 previous nominees for this Cabinet position won Senate confirmation in an average of eight days. Because of both personal and professional disagreements, Senator Clint Anderson took up the cause to make sure that Mr. Strauss would not be confirmed by the Senate. Senator Anderson found an ally in McGee on the Senate Commerce Committee, which had jurisdiction over Mr. Strauss' confirmation. During and after the Senate hearings, Senator McGee had charged Mr. Strauss with "a brazen attempt to hoodwink" the committee. 
After 16 days of hearings the Committee recommended Mr. Strauss' confirmation to the full Senate by a vote of 9-8. In preparation for the floor debate on the nomination, the Democratic majority's main argument against the nomination was that Mr. Strauss' statements before the Committee were "sprinkled with half truths and even lies ... and that under rough and hostile questioning, [he] can be evasive and quibblesome."
Despite an overwhelming Democratic majority, the 86th United States Congress was not able to accomplish much of their agenda since the President had immense popularity and a veto pen. With the 1960 elections nearing, congressional Democrats sought issues on which they could conspicuously oppose the Republican administration. The Strauss nomination proved tailor made.

On June 19, 1959 just after midnight, the Strauss nomination failed by a vote 46-49. At the time, It marked only the eighth time in U.S. history that a Cabinet appointee had failed to be confirmed.

1960 Democratic Convention 

From Harper's Magazine:

Relationship with President Kennedy 
By nature of their service together in the Senate, Senator McGee continued to enjoy a good relationship with President Kennedy while in the White House.  President Kennedy provided a recorded tribute to Senator McGee for a dinner in the Senator's honor in Wyoming in July 1963.  President Kennedy referred to him as "an old friend", and "an asset and a leader in this country."

As part of a nationwide tour in September 1963, President Kennedy made a stop in Cheyenne, and then boarded a smaller plane for the flight to Laramie. Senator McGee, as is protocol for a United States Senator, escorted the President in his travels throughout Wyoming. In a video of the President's tour (at the 4 minute, 50 second mark), Senator McGee can be seen disembarking with President Kennedy upon arrival in Laramie. President Kennedy then delivered remarks at the University of Wyoming.

Food Marketing Study (Public Law 88-354) 
McGee had concerns about falling cattle prices and that large chain drug stores were engaging in unfair practices with large meat processors at the expense of western cattle farmers. He felt an investigation was necessary to assess the "complete change" that had occurred in food marketing since World War II. He said the Commission should establish what, if any, "is the relationship between the phenomena of the food chain store and the increasing cost squeeze on the farm front."  On April 26, 1963, McGee introduced S J Res 71 which authorized the Federal Trade Commission to conduct an investigation of purchasing, processing, marketing and pricing practices of large chain stores to determine whether there may have been any violation of antitrust laws. Special emphasis was to be given to why a sharp drop in meat producers' income since January 1963 had not been reflected in consumer prices, which had generally remained level since a rise in 1962.

On July 3 President Johnson signed S J Res 71 into law (PL 88-354). The fiscal 1965 supplemental appropriations bill (HR 12633–PL 88-635) provided $700,000 to start the Commission's studies.

Mr. Johnson July 14 appointed the five public members of the Commission on Food Marketing. They were: William M. Batten, a Republican, president of the J. C. Penney Co.; Albert K. Mitchell, a cattle producer and Republican National Committeeman from New Mexico, former president of the American National Livestock Assn. and a member of several advisory committees to the Secretary of Agriculture; former U.S. Rep. J. Fred Marshall (D Minn. 1949-63), a farmer and former state director of the Minnesota Farm Security Administration (1941–48); Elmer R. Kiehl, a professor of agricultural economics, former dean of the College of Agriculture at the University of Missouri and member of the advisory commission to the Secretary of Agriculture; and Marvin Jones, of Texas, former Chief Justice of the U.S. Court of Claims (1947–64), a Democrat, who was named Commission Chairman. Jones resigned as chairman Sept. 1 and President Johnson Sept. 17 appointed Phil S. Gibson, former chief justice of the California Supreme Court, to replace him.

The five Senate members of the Commission, named by Majority Leader Mike Mansfield (D Mont.) July 1, were: Sens. Warren G. Magnuson (D Wash.), Commerce Committee chairman, Philip A. Hart (D Mich.), Thruston B. Morton (R Ky.), Gale W. McGee (D Wyo.) and Roman L. Hruska (R Neb.). The five House members, named July 7 by Speaker John W. McCormack (D Mass.), were: Reps. Benjamin S. Rosenthal (D N.Y.), Catherine May (R Wash.), Glenn Cunningham (R Neb.), Leonor Kretzer Sullivan (D Mo.) and Graham Purcell (D Texas).

1963 railroad strike 
In 1963, Congress acted for the first time in peacetime to impose compulsory arbitration in a major labor dispute. President Kennedy sent Congress a bill to submit a dispute over the railroads' attempts to eliminate "featherbedding" to the Interstate Commerce Commission, which was to impose an interim solution binding on the parties for two years.

During Congressional consideration of the President's legislation, McGee offered an amendment to remove these less controversial questions from arbitration and make the Senate bill conform with the House bill, thereby expediting passage to avoid the strike.  Congress on cleared the bill on August 28, 1963 that created a seven-member board to arbitrate the major issues in the dispute and prohibited the railroads from issuing "anti-featherbedding" rules. The arbitrated settlement was imposed for two years, and no strikes or lockouts were allowed during that time. The President signed the bill into law (PL 88-108) six hours before the strike was to begin on August 29, 1963.

1964 election 
Republican leaders in Wyoming were singularly focused on defeating McGee for re-election in 1964.  Republican Congressman William Henry Harrison ultimately decided not to challenge the incumbent Senator.  The remaining candidates for the Republican nomination did not offer stark differences between them, only their degree of attack upon McGee.

McGee took advantage and concentrated on discrediting the state Republican Party and promoted McGee's specific contributions to particular areas of the state, especially given his position on the Senate Appropriations Committee.

Counties thought to be steadfastly Republican, such as Big Horn County, wound up supporting both the re-election of President Johnson and Senator McGee.   The town of Lovell, never known to support a Democrat, gave Senator McGee 123 more votes than it gave President Johnson, 145 more than it gave McGee's opponent, oil company owner John Wold.  Lovell had been the beneficiary of thousands of dollars in Area Re-development Loans.  It was located close to the Yellowtail Dam, the State's most recent large reclamation project, and just before election learned that its interstate access road had been designated a federal highway.

Another important factor, like it was in the 1958 election, was organized labor and the State's right-to-work law.  The 1964 election found labor organized for political action in virtually every county in the state, most particularly in the pivotal counties of Natrona and Fremont, and the key Democratic counties of Laramie, Albany, Carbon, Sweetwater, and Uinta.  Organized labor distributed 23,000 bumper stickers with the phrase, "Poverty Lurks in Right-to-Work."  
Mass media, TV, radio and newspapers played its greatest role yet in a Wyoming campaign.  McGee's campaign released a 30-minute documentary, "This is Gale McGee" in the summer and it was broadcast on all local TV networks and was the single most effective use of the medium
Ultimately, McGee won reelection over Wold  by a margin of 16,397.

Second Senate term 
He strongly supported President Lyndon B. Johnson's views on the Vietnam War.  On March 6, 1965, CBS News aired an hour-long TV special titled "Vietnam: Hawks and the Doves" that featured a debate between McGee and Senator George McGovern for the full hour. It was moderated by Charles Collingwood.  Hanson Baldwin of the New York Times and former Assistant Secretary of State for Far Eastern Affairs (1963–64) Roger Hilsman also participated.  During the debate, McGee called for "planned escalation;" Baldwin contemplated massive bombing campaign and a naval blockade of North Vietnam.  It appeared that Hilsman agreed that troops should be sent, but didn't think it would make a difference.  McGovern was all alone in arguing against military intervention.  At the conclusion on the debate, Collingwood summarized that McGee was a "hawk" on Vietnam, McGovern a "dove" and Hilsman was a "chicken hawk."

Also that year, after over 10 years as a member of the Appropriations Committee, McGee was named chairman of the Foreign Operations Appropriations subcommittee.

In March 1966, McGee was appointed to the Foreign Relations Committee where he would serve until 1967 and then was reappointed in 1969 and served until he left the Senate.  He believed in the policy of containing communism, and his pro-military views were accented by his firm support for foreign aid.  Johnson strongly considered appointing Senator McGee to be Ambassador to the UN after the resignation of Arthur Goldberg.

In 1968, McGee wrote The Responsibilities of World Power, which warned against isolationism and urged the United States to accept its power and position imposed upon it in the aftermath of World War II. The book further argued that the U.S. had a responsibility to be a Pacific power, to act as a counterweight to China, and to support free nations in their efforts to remain nonaligned or western allies but not to fall into the Communist fold. The work was nominated for a Woodrow Wilson Foundation award.

  In 1969, McGee became chairman of the Post Office and Civil Service Committee.  As chair this Committee, he fought for greater equity in pay and benefits for those federal workers.  He was also directly involved in the passage of the Postal Reorganization Act which was influenced by the U.S. postal strike of 1970, the largest wildcat strike in history.  The Act abolished the then United States Post Office Department, which was a part of the cabinet, and created the United States Postal Service, a corporation-like independent agency with an official monopoly on the delivery of mail in the United States.

Voter registration by mail
In 1972, McGee introduced S. 352, which would allow eligible voters to register by mail in federal elections.  The bill would establish a new Voter Registration Administration as part of the U.S. Census Bureau to administer the registration program. Under the procedure, postcard forms would be mailed to all postal addresses and residences, and the cards would have to be returned to local registration agents no later than 30 days before a federal election. Processing of the forms would be paid for by the Voter Registration Administration.  McGee believed and argued that existing methods discouraged registration citing the fact that 62 million people did not vote in 1972 election, nearly half of all Americans eligible to vote.  Opponents believed that the proposal would destroy the two-party system, lead to increased fraud, and cost too much to implement.  The Nixon Administration formally opposed the bill citing the potential for fraud and cost but McGee's committee reported the bill with only Hiram Fong, the Committee's ranking Republican member, opposing.  During floor debate In spring 1973, the bill was filibustered for almost a month.  The 13th successful cloture vote since in the Senate came after two earlier attempts to terminate a four-week filibuster on the voter registration bill (S 352) failed. Had the May 9 vote also fallen short, McGee had warned opponents of S 352 during floor debate that not only would there have been another cloture vote, but "if necessary there'll be another and another and another."  The nearly 100 per cent attendance for the May 9 vote, plus three switches in favor of cloture on the third try, gave the cloture motion the necessary two-thirds vote. John C. Stennis (D Miss.) was the only senator to miss the vote.  Earlier efforts to shut off the talkathon on the bill failed by two and three votes, respectively. The April 30 vote was 56-31; the May 3 vote was 60-34. On May 9, cloture succeeded by a one-vote margin, 67-32.  Two Republicans and one Democrat switched from opposition to support for cloture on the May 9 67-32 vote. The Republicans were Robert T. Stafford (Vt.) and Milton R. Young (N.D.); both had voted against cloture on the two previous cloture motions. The Democrat was Russell B. Long (La.), who opposed cloture on the May -3 vote.  In addition, supporters of cloture gained four of five new votes of members who did not vote May 3: Alan Bible (D Nev.), Mark O. Hatfield (R Ore.), Joseph M. Montoya (D N.M.) and William B. Saxbe (R Ohio). John Sparkman (D Ala.), one of the other two members (along with Stennis) who did not vote May 3, cast the only additional vote against cloture.  Final passage of S. 352 was successful on May 9, 1973 by a vote of 57-32.  The legislation died after the House failed to take action on the bill.

1970 election 
McGee's bid for reelection in 1970 was targeted by Republicans as one of the top seven races in the country.  Republican leaders recruited Congressman John Wold to again take on McGee, despite Wold being defeated by McGee in the 1964 election.

McGee faced a primary challenger for the Democratic nomination because of McGee's support for continued military action in Vietnam.  McGee won nomination overwhelmingly by 24,508 votes.

McGee again promoted his seniority in the Senate and his committee assignments (Appropriations, Foreign Relations, and Post Office and Civil Service) that benefited the State.  To charges that he was a big spender of federal monies, he pointed out that he helped bring over $349 million in federal aid to Wyoming in the previous year and that if that was big spending he was "for it."   

Vice President Spiro Agnew supported Wold's campaign but never specifically mentioned McGee by name. The Denver Post chided the Vice President for speaking against McGee considering it was McGee who helped Nixon solve a major postal strike and continued to support military action in Vietnam.  The same newspaper reported that in 1969, McGee voted with the Nixon Administration 69 percent of the time and 24 percent against, while Wold only supported the Administration on issues 49 percent of the time, and opposed 28 percent.

McGee won re-election receiving 67,207 votes to Wold's 53,279.  McGee won eleven of the 23 counties he picked up in 1964 but added for others and increased his margin of victory in Natrona County, Wyoming – a moderately strong Republican county and Wold's home base.  McGee continued to have strong support of organized labor, carrying big margins in the southern "Union Pacific" counties.

Third Senate term 
In his third term he continued to be a leading member of the committees on which he served. He was Chairman of Western Hemisphere Affairs subcommittee of the Foreign Relations Committee.

McGee was a voice of moderation in the affairs of the Watergate scandal and the impeachment proceedings of President Richard Nixon. Against the wishes of many of his constituents, McGee stood on principle and fought hard for positions unpopular in Wyoming in support of gas rationing and the 55-mile per hour speed limit in the era of the first Arab oil embargoes.

Protection of bald and golden eagles
In his third Senate term, McGee gave up the gavel of the Foreign Operations Appropriations Subcommittee to become Chairman of Agriculture, Environmental and Consumer Protection Appropriations Subcommittee.  He would remain Chairman of that subcommittee until he left the Senate.  At an August 1971 hearing held by McGee's subcommittee, a Wyoming helicopter pilot testified that sheep ranchers paid him to fly near eagles which they killed with shotguns. About 500 bald eagles were destroyed in this manner, the pilot said.  The Wyoming Woolgrowers Association had claimed that 8,000 lambs were lost to eagles annually, and the group's president declared he had seen eagles kill grown sheep and antelope.  Conservationists disputed the figures and said that eagles seldom touched lambs unless they were already dead. A University of Montana study of prey items collected from 40 golden eagle nests over a three-year period found evidence of only one dead lamb and one dead sheep, with no proof they had been killed by eagles.  In October 1972, Congress approved legislation strengthening the penalties imposed for violations of Bald Eagle Protection Act of 1940.

27th U.N. General Assembly (1972)
A long-time supporter of the United Nations, McGee was appointed by President Richard Nixon to a four-member congressional delegation to represent the United States at the United Nations' 27th General Assembly in 1972.  His chief assignment at the Assembly was to get the United Nations members to agree to lower the U.S.'s share annual dues  from 31 percent to 25 percent - a difference of $13 million.  Both the House and Senate had already passed measures to limit the United States' contribution to the U.N.  But each country's share is ultimately decided by a majority of the 130 member nations.  Through the efforts of McGee, along with U.S. Ambassador to the U.N. George Bush, the U.N. assembly approved the reduction, with 80 nations voting to support the resolution.

"Champion" of Congressional recess 
In 1965, Senator McGee began calling for a mandated August recess for Congress. It was not until 1969 that his idea gained enough support amongst his colleagues that they gave it a test run - the Senate recessed from August 13 to September 3.  Finally, on August 6, 1971, as mandated by the Legislative Reorganization Act of 1970, the Senate began its first official August recess.   The account from the Office of the Senate Historian

Candidate for Director of Central Intelligence (CIA)
A July 10, 1975 memo from then White House Chief of Staff Donald Rumsfeld to President Gerald Ford listed McGee as one of many potential candidates to be Director of Central Intelligence.  Rumsfeld listed "pros and cons" of each candidate (including George Bush, Lee Iacocca, and Byron White and others).  The memo thought McGee was a strong defender of the intelligence community, respected within the foreign affairs community, and well-regarded for his independence.   On November 4, 1975, William Colby was replaced as CIA Director by George Bush in a major shakeup of President Ford's administration termed the Halloween Massacre.

1976 election 
In his 1976 bid for a fourth term, McGee was defeated by Republican challenger Malcolm Wallop, who ran an expensive television advertising campaign attacking McGee for, among other positions, his opposition to state right-to-work laws, and problems with the U.S. Postal Service, based on McGee's chairmanship of the U.S. Senate committee overseeing the Postal Service.  The margin of defeat was almost ten percentage points.

McGee-authored Legislation (or Legislation including McGee-authored provisions) Signed into Law 
April 29, 1960 -  Public Law (P.L.) 86-444: To revise the boundaries and change the name of the Fort Laramie National Monument, Wyoming to the he Fort Laramie National Historic Site.  Expanded the Fort Laramie National Historic Site to 563 acres.

May 5, 1960 -  P.L. 86-448: To permit the Secretary of the Interior to continue to deliver water to lands in the Third Division, Riverton Federal reclamation project.

May 6, 1960 -  P.L. 86-450: To place in trust status certain lands on the Wind River Indian Reservation in Wyoming

August 17, 1961 -  P.L. 87-151 to provide for the disposal of certain Federal property on the Minidoka project, Idaho; Shoshone project, Wyoming; and Yakima project, Washington.

August 30, 1961 -  P.L. 87-175 authorize the Secretary of Agriculture to exchange certain lands in the State of Wyoming with the town of Afton, Wyoming Land was to be used for municipal park.

March 20, 1962 -  P.L. 87-422 authorize and direct the Secretary of Agriculture to convey to the State of Wyoming for agricultural purposes certain real property in Sweetwater County, Wyoming.  McGee introduced the Senate companion legislation, S. 875.  The law transferred farmland located near Farson, Wyoming from the USDA to the State of Wyoming.  Land was used for demonstration of livestock and crop methods in areas of high altitude and short grazing seasons

June 8, 1962 -  P.L. 87-479: to Authorize continued delivery of water for the years 1962 and 1963 to land of the third division, Riverton Federal reclamation project, Wyoming.

July 2, 1962 -  P.L. 87-516: To adjust certain irrigation charges against non-Indian-owned lands within the Wind River irrigation project, Wyoming. McGee introduced the Senate companion legislation, S. 536.

April 18, 1963 -  P.L. 88-10 to permit the Secretary of the Interior to continue to deliver water to lands in the third division, Riverton Reclamation Project, Wyoming

March 26, 1964 -  P.L. 88-291 to defer certain operation and maintenance charges of the Eden Valley Irrigation and Drainage District.

July 2, 1964 -  P.L. 88-354 To establish a National Commission on Food Marketing to study the food industry from the producer to the consumer.  It authorized the Federal Trade Commission to conduct an investigation of purchasing, processing, marketing and pricing practices of large chain stores to determine whether there may have been any violation of antitrust laws. Special emphasis was to be given to why a sharp drop in meat producers' income since January 1963 had not been reflected in consumer prices, which had generally remained level since a rise in 1962.

August 26, 1964 -  P.L. 88-494 to authorize the Secretary of Agriculture to relinquish to the State of Wyoming jurisdiction over those lands within the Medicine Bow National Forest known as the Pole Mountain District

August 30, 1964 -  P.L. 88-507 Fiscal Year 1965 Independent Offices Appropriations Act.  McGee secured over $5 million for construction of the Post office and Federal Building in Casper, Wyoming.  In 1998, Congress designated the building as the Dick Cheney Federal Building, as part of the FY1999 Omnibus Consolidated Appropriations bill (P.L. 105-277).

September 2, 1964 -  P.L. 88-568 To provide for the construction, operation, and maintenance of the Savery-Pot Hook, Bostwick Park, and Fruitland Mesa participating reclamation projects under the Colorado River Storage Project Act.

March 8, 1966 -  P.L. 89-364 to cancel any unpaid reimbursable construction costs of the Wind River Indian irrigation project, Wyoming, chargeable against certain non Indian lands

October 16, 1966 -  P.L. 89-664 to provide for the establishment of the Bighorn Canyon National Recreation Area, and for other purposes;

November 5, 1966 -  P.L. 89-760 to provide for reimbursement to the State of Wyoming for improvements made on certain lands in Sweetwater County, Wyoming, if and when such lands revert to the United States.  Law provided $25,000 (equivalent to almost $220,000 in 2022 dollars) to reimburse Wyoming for improvements made to the Farson Pilot Farm

November 5, 1966 -  P.L. 89-763 to amend the act approved March 18, 1950, providing for the construction of airports in or in close proximity to national parks, national monuments, and national recreation areas, and for other purposes.  Law provided $1.5 million (equivalent to almost $13.1 million in 2022 dollars) for the Jackson Hole Airport

April 13, 1966 -  P.L. 89-387, the Uniform Time Act, to make uniform dates for daylight savings time

May 24, 1968 -  P.L. 90-317 to place in trust status certain lands on the Wind River Indian Reservation in Wyoming

October 1, 1968 -  P.L. 90-540 to establish the Flaming Gorge National Recreation Area in the States of Utah and Wyoming, and for other purposes.

December 30, 1969 -  P.L. 91-187 To amend title 5, United States Code, to provide for additional positions in grades GS-16. GS-17, and GS-18. These were eliminated under the provisions of the Civil Service Reform Act of 1978 and replaced by the Senior Executive Service.

April 15, 1970 -  P.L. 91-231 to increase the pay of Federal employees

August 12, 1970 -  P.L. 91-375, Postal Reorganization Act, to improve and modernize the postal service, to reorganize the Post Office Department, and for other purposes.

September 25, 1970 -  P.L. 91-409 to reauthorize the Riverton extension unit, Missouri River Basin project, to include therein the entire Riverton Federal reclamation project

September 25, 1970 -  P.L. 91-418 to provide that the Federal Government shall pay one-half of the cost of health insurance for Federal employees and annuitants.  Altered the determination of the government’s share of premiums by creating the “big six” formula, calculated separately for individual and family plans Set the government’s share at 40% of the simple average of premiums for the six health plans.

October 26, 1970 -  P.L. 91-510, The Legislative Reorganization Act of 1970.  Sec. 132(a) Provided for a set Congressional recess during the summer, long championed by McGee.

March 9, 1972 -  P.L. 92-243 to amend chapter 83 of title 5, United States Code, relating to adopted child

October 9, 1972 -  P.L. 92-476 to designate the Stratified Primitive Area as a part of the Washakie Wilderness,
heretofore known as the South Absaroka Wilderness, Shoshone National Forest, in the State of Wyoming, and for other purposes. The law set aside 208,000 acres of wilderness for protection under the National Wilderness Preservation Act.  It also designated a 30,000-acre tract in the upper drainage of DuNoir Creek as a special management area to be studied for 5 years.

October 23, 1972 -  P.L. 92-537 to establish the Fossil Butte National Monument in the State of Wyoming.  Fossil Butte National Monument preserves the best paleontological record of Cenozoic aquatic communities in North America and possibly the world.

July 23, 1974 -  P.L. 93-354, National Diabetes Mellitus Research and Education Act, to amend the Public Health Service Act to provide for greater and more effective efforts in research and public education with regard to diabetes mellitus.  The Act established the National Commission on Diabetes. This group established the first long-term plan to address diabetes prevention and treatment in the US, leading to improved funding for related research, treatment programs, and eventually the National Diabetes Prevention Program (NDPP).  This commission’s recommendations resulted in federal policies that addressed the US diabetes epidemic.

United States Ambassador to the Organization of American States 
After his defeat by Malcolm Wallop, McGee was nominated by President Jimmy Carter as United States Ambassador to the Organization of American States.  After approval by the Senate, he was sworn in on March 30, 1977 at a ceremony in the Roosevelt Room in the White House by Judge John Sirica.  His former colleague from the U.S. Senate, Vice President Walter Mondale, was in attendance as were former U.S. secretaries of State Henry Kissinger and William P. Rogers, former United States Ambassador to South Vietnam Ellsworth Bunker, Under Secretary of State Warren Christopher, National Security Advisor Zbigniew Brzezinski, and senators John Sparkman and William Fulbright.

During his tenure, McGee headed the U.S. delegation to four OAS assemblies and lobbied for the successful approval of the 1978 Panama Canal Treaty.

Life after public service
In September 1981, McGee formed Gale W. McGee Associates, a consulting firm specializing in international and public affairs activities. The firm offered a broad range of political and economic services to both domestic and international companies with a special emphasis on developing new business opportunities with the nations of Latin America and the Caribbean.

McGee later served as president of the American League for Exports and Security Assistance, Inc. in 1986

He was a senior consultant at Hill & Knowlton, Inc. from 1987 to 1989;

He was also president of the consulting firm of Moss, McGee, Bradley, Kelly & Foley, which was created with former U.S. Senator Frank Moss.

Indochina Refugees
In September 1985, Secretary of State George Shultz asked McGee to serve on a panel headed by Robert D. Ray to review U.S. policy towards Indochinese refugees. In the wake of the 1975 collapse of the South Vietnamese government, more than 1.6 million Indochinese people had become refugees.  The panel issued recommendations in 1986.

Personal life 
McGee married Loraine Baker in 1939 and together they had four children: David, Robert, Mary Gale and Lori Ann. Senator McGee died on April 9, 1992, in Washington, D.C. He is buried in Oak Hill Cemetery in Washington, D.C.

Congressional recognition 
In January 2007, the Wyoming congressional delegation introduced federal legislation (H.R. 335, S. 219) to rename the U.S. Post Office in Laramie, Wyoming as the "Gale W. McGee Post Office." The United States House of Representatives passed the legislation by voice vote on January 29, 2007. The United States Senate passed the legislation by Unanimous consent on February 7, 2007. The President signed the bill into law on March 7, 2007.

References

External links

 Gale McGee Papers at the University of Wyoming - American Heritage Center
 Select Digital Collections of the McGee Papers at the AHC digital archive
 Blog posts related to McGee on AHC blog

1915 births
1992 deaths
Wyoming Democrats
Permanent Representatives of the United States to the Organization of American States
Democratic Party United States senators from Wyoming
University of Wyoming faculty
Burials at Oak Hill Cemetery (Washington, D.C.)
20th-century American politicians